Daniel Moreau Barringer (July 30, 1806 – September 1, 1873) was a slave owner and Whig U.S. Congressman from North Carolina between 1843 and 1849. He joined the Democratic Party by the early 1870s.

Early life and education
Born near Concord, North Carolina, in 1806 to Elizabeth Brandon and Paul Barringer, Daniel had nine siblings, including at least two brothers. His middle name is from French Huguenot ancestors, who came as refugees to North Carolina. The Barringer sons were likely tutored at home in their early studies. Barringer attended the University of North Carolina at Chapel Hill. Graduating in 1826, he went on to study law in Hillsborough with an established firm, and was admitted to the bar.

Career
Barringer returned to his hometown of Concord in 1829, where he began a law practice. He also entered politics. That same year, he was elected to the North Carolina House of Commons; he would serve there until 1834. He was re-elected for additional terms in 1840 and 1842. He also served as a member of the 1835 North Carolina constitutional convention.

In 1842, Barringer was elected as a Whig to the 28th United States Congress. He was subsequently reelected to the 29th and 30th sessions. During the 30th Congress, he chaired the Committee on Indian Affairs and the Committee on Expenditures in the Department of State. He became a personal friend of fellow congressman Abraham Lincoln. During this period, his younger brother, Rufus Clay Barringer, studied law with him to prepare for passing the bar exam. The younger Barringer set up a practice in their hometown of Concord, North Carolina, and also entered politics in the state. 

Declining to run for a fourth congressional term in 1848, Daniel Barringer was appointed by President Zachary Taylor as minister to Spain, where he served from 1849 to 1853. In 1854, upon returning to North Carolina, he was elected to another term in the House of Commons.

At the outbreak of the American Civil War, Barringer was a delegate to the 1861 Peace Convention held in Washington, D.C. After the American Civil War, he was a participant in the Union National Convention of 1866, an effort by numerous politicians to gather support for President Andrew Johnson. 

Barringer became a Democrat. He chaired the North Carolina Democratic Party in 1872, taking over after the death of Thomas Bragg. Barringer died September 1, 1873 aged 67, in White Sulphur Springs, West Virginia, and was buried in Greenmount Cemetery in Baltimore, Maryland.

Barringer was the older brother of Civil War cavalry Brigadier General Rufus Barringer. They were sons of General Paul Barringer, and nephews of Daniel Laurens Barringer, who had previously been a Congressman from North Carolina. Barringer's son, Daniel Barringer, became famous for proving the meteoritic origins of the Meteor Crater in Arizona.

Sources

1806 births
1873 deaths
Daniel Moreau
People from Cabarrus County, North Carolina
American people of German descent
American people of French descent
Whig Party members of the United States House of Representatives from North Carolina
North Carolina Democratic Party chairs
North Carolina Democrats
Ambassadors of the United States to Spain
19th-century American diplomats
Members of the North Carolina House of Representatives
University of North Carolina at Chapel Hill alumni
People of North Carolina in the American Civil War
Burials at Green Mount Cemetery